The Rufus C. Holman House is a house located in southwest Portland, Oregon, listed on the National Register of Historic Places. It is located in the Southwest Hills neighborhood.

It was designed by Portland architect David L. Williams in Colonial Revival style.

See also
 Rufus C. Holman
 National Register of Historic Places listings in Southwest Portland, Oregon

References

1913 establishments in Oregon
Colonial Revival architecture in Oregon
Southwest Hills, Portland, Oregon
Houses completed in 1913
Houses on the National Register of Historic Places in Portland, Oregon
Portland Historic Landmarks